Dust is the debut album by Dust, released by Kama Sutra Records in January 1971.

Track listing

Personnel
Dust
Richie Wise – electric and acoustic guitars, vocals
Marc Bell – drums
Kenny Aaronson – bass, steel, dobro and bottleneck guitars
Kenny Kerner – lyrics, production, management

References

External links
 

1971 debut albums
Kama Sutra Records albums
Albums produced by Kenny Aaronson